Nima Nakisa (born May 1, 1975, in Tehran) is an Iranian Singer and retired football goalkeeper.

Club career
Nakisa first entered the limelight in Iranian football when he played for Persepolis FC. Following World Cup 1998, Nakisa was transferred to Albanian Side KS Flamurtari Vlorë, but left very soon after to AO Kavalas. He had a tough time there, and moved back to Iran the season after. He went back to Persepolis but due to his rivalry with Abedzadeh, Nakisa decided to leave the club for Pas Tehran. He played there until August 2006, when he quit after having an argument with Pas Tehran officials. There was speculation linking him to Esteghlal Ahvaz, but after the signing of Ebrahim Mirzapour, Nakisa was no longer needed. Due to this he missed the IPL transfer deadline and was forced to sign with a lower league team, on September 4, 2006, it was announced that Nima Nakisa had officially signed a one-year contract with Azadegan League outfit Esteghlal Jonub Dezful.

On July 23, 2007, Nakisa signed with IPL club Esteghlal Ahvaz F.C., the club he was destined to sign with for the 2006/07 season on a one-year deal, however in his first game he had to be subbed out due to injury. His injury has set him back and is thought he will never be able to play again.

Nima Nakisa officially retired from professional football shortly after to pursue a singing career.

International career
Nakisa made his first appearance for the Iranian national team in a friendly versus Lebanon on November 13, 1996. Nakisa was playing for Persepolis FC at the time. Because of an injury to Iran's number one goalkeeper, Ahmadreza Abedzadeh, Nakisa started all of Iran's games in Asia Cup 1996, performing quite well despite his lack of experience. He was called up again to the national team for World Cup 1998. Once again Abedzadeh was injured and Nakisa started in his place for the first game versus Yugoslavia national football team. Nakisa was extremely nervous, and his mistake allowed Siniša Mihajlović to score on a free kick. Iran lost the game 1–0. Nakisa did not start the other two games and his only other international appearances after that were at the Thailand Asian Games in 1998. He was called up to the national team again by Iran's next manager Branko Ivanković, but did not play.

Honours

Club
Persepolis
Iranian Football League: 1995–96

Pas
Iranian Football League: 2003–04

National
Iran
Asian Games Gold Medal: 1998

Personal life
Nakisa has a background in music. He is able to play the piano, and also released a music album in 2005.

External links
Nima Nakisa at TeamMelli.com

1975 births
Living people
Iranian footballers
1996 AFC Asian Cup players
1998 FIFA World Cup players
Association football goalkeepers
Expatriate footballers in Albania
Expatriate footballers in Greece
Iran international footballers
Iranian expatriate footballers
Sportspeople from Tehran
Payam Mashhad players
Asian Games gold medalists for Iran
Persepolis F.C. players
Asian Games medalists in football
Footballers at the 1998 Asian Games
21st-century Iranian male singers
Medalists at the 1998 Asian Games
Iranian expatriate sportspeople in Greece